Michele Dayan (born 2 October 1961) is a former Israeli footballer who works as the manager.

Honours
Liga Artzit (1):
2001–02

References

1961 births
Living people
Israeli Jews
Israeli footballers
Hapoel Jerusalem F.C. players
Footballers from Jerusalem
Bnei Yehuda Tel Aviv F.C. players
Hapoel Ashdod F.C. players
Hapoel Tzafririm Holon F.C. players
Hapoel Jerusalem F.C. managers
Hapoel Ashkelon F.C. managers
Hapoel Bnei Lod F.C. managers
Hapoel Ironi Kiryat Shmona F.C. managers
Israeli Premier League managers
Association football midfielders
Israeli football managers